Csaba Horváth (born 19 November 1969) is a Hungarian politician.

Biography 

He served as the mayor of the 2nd district of Budapest from 2002 to 2006, and as Deputy Mayor of Budapest during the last term of Mayor Gábor Demszky, between 2007 and 2009. He was elected member of the National Assembly (MP) from the Budapest Regional List of the Hungarian Socialist Party (MSZP) in 2002, holding the position until his resignation in 2010. He was the MSZP's candidate for the position of Mayor of Budapest in the 2010 municipal election, but defeated by Fidesz-candidate István Tarlós. Thereafter he became leader of the Socialists' group in the General Assembly of Budapest.

Since 2019 he serves as the mayor of the Zugló.

References

1969 births
Living people
Mayors of places in Hungary
Hungarian Socialist Party politicians
Members of the National Assembly of Hungary (2002–2006)
Members of the National Assembly of Hungary (2006–2010)
Members of the National Assembly of Hungary (2010–2014)
Politicians from Budapest